Jack Clement (born 27 February 2001) is an English professional rugby union player who plays as a flanker for Premiership Rugby club Gloucester.

Rugby career

Club
Clement began his rugby career at Bournside School when he was fourteen and went on to captain Cheltenham College. He joined the academy of Gloucester aged seventeen and made his senior debut during the  2019–20 season.

International
In February 2018 Clement was selected for the England Under-17 team and later that year made his England U18 debut against France in the International summer Series playing all three games during their tour of South Africa. He played twice for England U20 in the curtailed 2020 Six Nations Under 20s Championship. Later that year Clement received his first call-up to the senior England squad by coach Eddie Jones for a training camp.

Clement started every game for the England side that completed a grand slam in the 2021 Six Nations Under 20s Championship. He was player of the match against Ireland and scored his only try of the competition during the penultimate round against Wales. A candidate for player of the tournament, however this honour was awarded to teammate and captain of the side, Jack van Poortvliet.

References

External links
Gloucester Rugby Profile
England Rugby Profile
All Rugby Profile

2001 births
Living people
English rugby union players
Gloucester Rugby players
People educated at Cheltenham College
Rugby union flankers
Rugby union players from Walsall